The Char Dham Railway, the Indian Railways's under construction twin railway lines under Char Dham Pariyojana project by connecting the holiest places of Hinduism called Chota Char Dham, from the existing Doiwala railway station near Dehradun to Gangotri and Yamunotri via a fork at Uttarkashi and another set of twin rail links from the upcoming railway station at Karnaprayag to Kedarnath and Badrinath via a fork at Saikot. The line is also of strategic military importance and has been designated a national project.

Railway routes

Existing railheads
At present, the relevant railway lines are as follows:
From the Raiwala Junction railway station, one line goes in north-west direction via Doiwala Railway Station and terminates in Dehradun; another line goes in north-east direction to terminate in Rishikesh (at the new Yog Nagari Rishikesh railway station, the old Rishikesh railway station being almost defunct).
The Rishikesh–Karnaprayag line is already under construction, to extend the railway network beyond Yog Nagari Rishikesh railway station, and upon completion, Karnaprayag will become the terminal point
The Chaar Dhaam Railway will consist of two different railway lines:
one taking off from the existing railhead at Doiwala and going towards Gangotri, with a fork towards Yamunotri
the other taking off from the forthcoming railhead at Karnaprayag and going towards Kedarnath, with a fork towards Badrinath

Proposed new lines
The Char Dham Railway has two different Y-shaped railways, with total of the following four individual rail lines:

 A. Gangotri–Yamunotri spurs: Main spur will go to Gangotri which will also Y–fork for another spur to Yamunotri. 
A1. Doiwala–Dehradun–Uttarkashi–Maneri Gangotri Railway 131 km long route will have the following 11 stations: Doiwala, Sangatiyawala Khurd, Sarangdharwala, Ampata, Maror, Kandisaur, Chinyalisaur, Dunda, Athali Junction, Ladari and Maneri. Pilgrims will road transport from Maneri to Harsil-Gangotri via  NH-34. This will take the railway and Char Dham road highway at Gangotri closer to the large disputed India-China border area of Nelang Valley which is currently in India's operational control. Maneri to Gangotri is a further 84 km.
 A2. Uttarkashi–Palar Yamunotri Railway, 22 km long route will make a "Y" fork connection at Athali Junction from the Gangotri railway above to reach Palar railway station, from where pilgrims will take road and track to Yamunotri. Palar to Yamunotri is a further 42 km.

 B. Kedarnath–Badrinath spurs: Main spur will go to Kedarnath which will also Y–fork for another spur to Badrinath.
 B1. Karnaprayag–Saikot–Sonprayag Kedarnath Railway 99 km long route will have the following 7 stations: Karnaprayag, Siwai, Saikot Junction, Bairath, Chopta, Makkumath and Sonprayag near Gaurikund. The distance from Sonprayag to Kedarnath is 19 km. The 6 km stretch from Sonprayag to Gaurikund is paved and motorable, whereas the remaining 13-14 km is a mountainous track, which must be done either on foot, or by palanquin, or on pony-back.
 B2. Saikot–Joshimath Badrinath Railway, 75 km long route will make a "Y" fork connection at Saikot from the Kedarnath railway above to Joshimath. It will have the following 4 stations: Saikot Junction, Tripak, Tartoli and Joshimath. Pilgrims will travel the 37 km from Joshimath to Badrinath by the existing all-weather road. This will take the railway network closer to the disputed India-China border area of Bara Hoti valley, which is currently in India's operational control, and make it easier to supply equipment and troops to that border post. 

 Note: Rishikesh–Karnaprayag Railway is also an under construction new railway link extension from the exiting Rishikesh railway station to Karnaprayag. It will have the following 11 stations: Rishikesh, Shivpuri, Byasi, Devprayag, Maletha, Srinagar, Dhari, Rudraprayag, Gholtir, Gauchar, Karnaprayag.

Strategic importance
Once this railway line is completed, India-China border will be closer to the rest of India by railways. The time taken to reach the strategic border military stations from Delhi will be reduced by providing safe and quick mode of public transport for personnel and equipment.

Challenges
After the Konkan Railway, Hassan–Mangalore line and Jammu–Baramulla line, this line will be the most challenging railway project in Indian Railways due to mountainous terrain, a large number of tunnels and high bridges and severe cold weather in flood, landslide and earthquake prone high altitude mountainous area.

Current status
Char Dham Railway project's 327 km long construction, costing ₹43,292 crore (USD $6.6 billion), began with the foundation stone laying and commencement of ₹120 crore Final Location Survey (FSL) in May 2017 by the Union Minister of Railways Suresh Prabhu. In January 2018, reconnaissance survey was complete, and final survey using airborne electromagnetic technique was underway by Turkish-Ukrainian company, which will be completed in 2 years, after which track laying would begin in December 2019. As of July, 2020 New Rishikesh railway station is ready and operational. Bridge over Chandrabhaga river is being laid. Also a bridge over Alaknanda river in Tehri is under construction. Both these bridges will be ready by 2021 as per plan. Land for all railway stations is acquired and work is going on in small phases over the entire route.

See also

 Char Dham Highway
 Diamond Quadrilateral railway project
 Golden Quadrilateral road project
 Setu Bharatam railway crossing-free flyover and underpass project
 New geostrategic rail lines of India under construction

References

Rail transport in Uttarakhand

Proposed railway lines in India
Modi administration initiatives